Al-Jihad is a Syrian football club based in the northeastern city of Qamishli, founded in 1962. They play at the 7 April Stadium of Qamishli.

Current squad

References

Football clubs in Syria
Association football clubs established in 1962
1962 establishments in Syria
Qamishli